Chapman's antshrike (Thamnophilus zarumae) is a species of bird in the family Thamnophilidae. It is found in Ecuador and Peru. Its natural habitat is subtropical or tropical dry forests.

Diet and foraging behavior
Chapman's antshrike's are insectivorous and their diet consists of caterpillars (larval Lepidoptera) and berries from the Meliaceae tree.

Forages from low near the ground up to 15 m above the ground inside forest. Forages in typical antshrike fashion: moves through foliage with a series of short hops, pausing between moves to scan surrounding vegetation for prey. Gleans prey from leaves, stems, vines and branches. One pair repeatedly probed small epiphytic bromeliads.

Song
The song lacks the characteristic terminal "bark" of the song of the barred antshrike Thamnophilus doliatus. The song consists of three elements: it begins with an accelerating series of 12-14 nasal notes, followed by three higher pitched, broad amplitude notes and then ending in a short rattle or trill. Calls include an "abrupt 'chup' "  and "a high, descending, mewing whistle: 'peew' "

Conservation status
The Chapman's antshrike has a very restricted geographic distribution. Nonetheless, its conservation status is rated by BirdLife International as Least Concern. On the other hand,  considered its conservation priority to be High.

Effects of human activity on populations
A considerable amount of suitable habitat has been lost to agriculture, especially within the Ecuador portion of its range. The Chapman's Antshrike occurs in the Reserva Nacional Tumbes in Peru, which protects a significant amount of habitat for this species.

References

Thamnophilus
Birds of Ecuador
Birds of Peru
Birds of the Tumbes-Chocó-Magdalena
Birds described in 1921
Taxonomy articles created by Polbot